Feyt is a commune in the Corrèze department of central France.

Geography
The Chavanon forms the commune's southeastern boundary.

Population

See also
Communes of the Corrèze department

References

Communes of Corrèze
Corrèze communes articles needing translation from French Wikipedia